Zel Keh-ye Olya (also Romanized as Z̄el Keh-ye ‘Olyā; also known as Z̄īlakeh-ye ‘Olyā) is a village in Chaybasar-e Shomali Rural District, Bazargan District, Maku County, West Azerbaijan Province, Iran. At the 2006 census, its population was 750, in 134 families.

References 

Populated places in Maku County